Hotel Indigo is a chain of small, individually owned boutique hotels, which is part of IHG Hotels & Resorts.  As of December 2021, there were 130 Hotel Indigo properties featuring 16,343 rooms worldwide.

History
The first Hotel Indigo opened in Atlanta, Georgia in October 2004 and a second location opened in the historic Gold Coast neighborhood of Chicago, Illinois in May 2005 (later going into foreclosure and re-branding as the Claridge House). The brand's first non-US property debuted in Ottawa, Ontario, Canada (which later went independent from the InterContinental brand).

In July 2019 at the Traverse City, Michigan Hotel Indigo, a murder-suicide occurred inside room 318, only blocks away from the National Cherry Festival.

See also
 Branicki Residential House, which currently houses the Hotel Indigo, Warsaw
 Hotel Indigo Atlanta Midtown
 Hotel Indigo Edinburgh
 Hotel Indigo, Stratford-upon-Avon

References

External links

 

Boutique resort chains
Hotels established in 2004
InterContinental Hotels Group brands